Abbie Gerrish-Jones  (September 10, 1863 – February 5, 1929) was an American composer, librettist and music writer.

Life
Abbie Gerrish-Jones was born in Vallejo, California, and grew up in Sacramento. She began playing piano and composing at an early age and studied with Charles Winter. Her opera Priscilla is considered the first complete opera with both libretto and score composed by an American woman. One of her compositions won the Josef Hoffmann prize for "best American piano work". She wrote for Pacific Town Talk, The Pacific Coast Musical Review and The Musical Courier, published in New York. She died in Seattle, Washington.

Works
Gerrish-Jones was known for operas, considered to be  of an eerie quality, and composed nine. She also wrote over 100 songs. Selected works include:
 Priscilla (1887) opera
Sakura, opera (with Gerta Weismer Hoffmann)
The Snow Queen, music drama (with Gerta Weismer Hoffmann)
If I were thou, song (Text: Elizabeth Barrett Browning)

References

1863 births
1929 deaths
19th-century classical composers
20th-century classical composers
American women classical composers
American classical composers
Musicians from Vallejo, California
19th-century American composers
20th-century American women musicians
20th-century American composers
Classical musicians from California
20th-century women composers
19th-century women composers
19th-century American women musicians